Port Victoria is a small town in Western Kenya, located in the southern parts of Western province on the shores of Lake Victoria in Busia County just at the Kenya-Uganda border. Fishing is the main economic activity of the people in Port Victoria. The town has a population of 12,194 people and is located at an altitude of about 1,149m.

Port Victoria is approximately 50 km away from Busia town, 90 km from Kisumu city and 352 km from Nairobi, the capital city of Kenya.

References

Populated places in Busia County